Barbara O'Neal is an American romance novelist who has written over forty books under different pen names.

O'Neal's books include The Lost Recipe for Happiness, How to Bake a Perfect Life, The Goddesses of Kitchen Avenue and Lady Luck's Map of Vegas.

O'Neal has written women's fiction under the names Barbara O’Neal and Barbara Samuel, contemporary and historical romance novels under Barbara Samuel and Ruth Wind, and new adult romances under Lark O’Neal.

Career
O'Neal began her writing career as an author for Harlequin Silhouette. Writing as Ruth Wind, she has published over twenty contemporary romances, winning two RITA awards in this genre. Under the name Barbara Samuel, she has written seven historical romances, winning a RITA in 1998 for her book, Heart of a Knight.

In 2000, O'Neal began writing women's fiction under the name Barbara Samuel, publishing five books under this name until moving her women's fiction titles under the name Barbara O’Neal. These books are set mostly in her home state of Colorado or New Mexico, with themes of food, second chances, and multi-generational stories about women. She has won three RITA awards for her women's fiction work, making her eligible for the Romance Writers of America Hall of Fame, into which she was inducted in 2012.

O'Neal has won the RITA award seven times and been nominated for seven others. Her books have also won two Colorado Book Awards, and been named Favorite Book of the Year from Romance Writers of America, a Target Book Club pick, and a top book from Library Journal.

When New Adult Romance emerged as a new genre 2013, O'Neal began writing as Lark O’Neal, launching her first New Adult series, Going the Distance, later that year.

Personal life
O'Neal lives in Colorado Springs, Colorado with her partner, an endurance athlete.

Bibliography

Women's Fiction

Published as Barbara O'Neal
 Write My Name Across the Sky. Lake Union. August 2021. 
 The Lost Girls of Devon. Lake Union. July 2020. 
 When We Believed in Mermaids. Lake Union. July 2019. 
 The Art of Inheriting Secrets. Lake Union. July 2018. 
 The All You Can Dream Buffet. Bantam. March 2014. .
 The Garden of Happy Endings. Bantam. April 2012. .
 How to Bake a Perfect Life. Bantam. December 2010. .
 The Secret of Everything. Bantam. December 2009. .
 The Lost Recipe for Happiness. Bantam. December 2008. .

Published as Barbara Samuel
 The Scent of Hours (originally published as Madame Mirabou's School of Love). Ballantine. March 2006. .
 Lady Luck's Map of Vegas. Ballantine. January 2005. .
 The Goddesses of Kitchen Avenue. Ballantine. February 2004. .
 A Piece of Heaven. Ballantine. February 2003. .
 No Place Like Home. Ballantine. February 2003. .

Published as Ruth Wind
 In the Midnight Rain. HarperCollins. May 2000. .

New Adult Romance

Published as Lark O'Neal
 Random. November 2013.
 Stoked. February 2014.
 Epic. August 2014. 
 Brilliant. December 2014. 
 Intense. May 2015. 
 Extreme. December 2015.

Contemporary Romance

Published as Ruth Wind
 Miranda's Revenge. Silhouette. September 2007. .
 Desi's Rescue. Silhouette. April 2007, .
 Juliet's Law. Silhouette. October 2006. .
 The Diamond Secret. Silhouette. January 2010. .
 Countdown. Silhouette. April 2005. .
 Born Brave. Silhouette. October 2001. .
 Beautiful Stranger. Silhouette. June 2000. .
 Rio Grande Wedding. Silhouette. November 1999. .
 For Christmas Forever. Silhouette. December 1998. .
 Meant to be Married. Silhouette. August 1998. .
 Her Ideal Man. Silhouette. August 1997. .
 Reckless. Silhouette. July 1997. .
 Marriage Material. Silhouette. June 1997. .
 Rainsinger. Silhouette. May 1996. .
 The Last Chance Ranch. Silhouette. August 1995. .
 Breaking the Rules. Silhouette. August 1994. .
 Walk in Beauty. Silhouette. April 1994. .
 Jezebel's Blues. Silhouette. December 1992. .
 A Minute to Smile. Silhouette. May 1992. .
 Light of Day. Silhouette. November 1990. .
 Summer's Freedom. Silhouette. March 1990. .
 Strangers On a Train. Silhouette. October 1988. .

Historical Romance

Published as Barbara Samuel
 Night of Fire. Avon. December 2000. .
 The Black Angel. HarperCollins. October 1999. .
 Heart of a Knight. HarperCollins. August 1997. .
 Dancing Moon. HarperCollins. September 1996. .
 Lucien's Fall. HarperCollins. September 1995. .
 A Winter Ballad. HarperCollins. November 1994. .
 A Bed of Spices. HarperCollins. September 1993. .

Nonfiction

Published as Barbara Samuel
 The Care and Feeding of The Girls in the Basement: An Upbeat Guide to Life as a Writer. eBook.
 The Girls in the Basement: Celebration Book, A Writer's Guide to Joy. eBook.

Omnibus
 Seal of My Dreams. Belle Bridge Books. November 2011. .
 Chalice of Roses. NAL. January 2010. . (with Jo Beverley, Mary Jo Putney, Karen Harbaugh)
 A Mother's Love. Harlequin. April 2008. . (with Janice Kay Johnson, Raeanne Thayne)
 Dragon Lovers. NAL. March 2007. . (with Jo Beverley, Mary Jo Putney, Karen Harbaugh)
 Lakota Legacy. Harlequin. October 2003. . (with Madeline Baker, Kathleen Eagle)
 Faery Magic. Kensington. 1998. . (with Jo Beverley, Mary Jo Putney, Karen Harbaugh)
 Irish Magic II. Kensington. June 2009 (re-release). . (with Susan Wiggs, Morgan Llywelyn, Roberta Gellis)
 Irish Magic. Kensington. February 1996, . (with Susan Wiggs, Morgan Llywelyn, Roberta Gellis)

Awards
 2012 ROMANCE WRITERS HALL OF FAME for Strong Romantic Elements 
 2012 RITA Award for Best Novel with Strong Romantic Elements for How to Bake a Perfect Life
 2010 RITA Award for Best Novel with Strong Romantic Elements for The Lost Recipe for Happiness"
 2006 RITA Award for Best Novel with Strong Romantic Elements for Lady Luck's Map of Vegas (written as Barbara Samuel)
 2003 RITA Award for Best Contemporary Single Title for No Place Like Home (written as Barbara Samuel)
 1999 RITA Award for Best Long Contemporary Romance for Meant to be Married (written as Ruth Wind)
 1998 RITA Award for Best Short Historical for Heart of a Knight (written as Barbara Samuel)
 1998 RITA Award for Best Long Contemporary Series Romance for Reckless (written as Ruth Wind'')

External links
 Barbara O'Neal web site
 Barbara Samuel web site
 Lark O'Neal web site

References

American romantic fiction writers
RITA Award winners